Death Comes to Time is a webcast audio drama based on the long-running British science fiction television series Doctor Who, produced by the BBC and first broadcast in five episodes on the BBCi Cult website from 12 July 2001, accompanied by limited animation.

It was the BBC's first new Doctor Who broadcast since the 1996 film.

Synopsis
When two Time Lords are killed, the Seventh Doctor together with his companion Antimony must stop the powerful General Tannis' plans for conquest and Ace is groomed to face a new destiny.

Plot
In a show of force, General Tannis destroys the city of Annit — population 9 million — and then demands the surrender of Admiral Mettna. This is the first stage in the Canisian invasion of the Santine Republic, which falls quickly. Tannis himself kills their president. It is to this world the Seventh Doctor and Antimony have arrived. The Doctor soon meets Senator Sala, the leader of the resistance and rescues her and other resistance fighters from captivity. When the Doctor sees burning trees, he realises someone is trying to contact him.

A being identifying himself as a "God of the Fourth" appears on a spaceship to rescue a prisoner — that prisoner is Ace. He tells her that he is Casmus, and that she was rescued so that she could learn.

The Doctor and Antimony travel to the Temple of the Fourth on the planet Micen Island, where they see the statues of long dead Time Lords. They see an inscription "We serve the many, until the many are One, until twilight falls and death comes to Time." A Time Lord called The Minister of Chance arrives, it was he who had sent the Doctor a message. The Minister informs the Doctor that two Time Lords — the Saints Antinor and Valentine have been brutally murdered on Earth. The Doctor wistfully says that even Time Lords die, but the Minister fears a greater evil. The Minister travels to Santiny to replace the Doctor, whilst the Doctor sets out to investigate what has happened to the Saints.

The Doctor and Antimony arrive at an analysis centre for radio telescopes. They meet Dr Kane who tells them Dr Valentine and Antinor were killed by animals — perhaps a dog or a large cat — they were bitten. The Doctor asks her what they were investigating before they died. The Doctor discovers that black holes are being created and that existing ones are growing at a drastic rate. Something has torn a rent in space-time. Two policemen, Campion and Speedwell, arrive at the centre investigating the Doctor's activities at the crime scene, but Speedwell is called away to another animal attack in the East End of London, accompanied by the Doctor.

The Doctor sees the body of a young woman with bite marks in her neck, and also another police constable. Investigating further they enter a bar and find twenty bodies with their throats ripped out, and see a figure flee from the scene.

Meanwhile, Ace wakes from a dream about being rowed to the edge of a whirlpool by a man who seems friendly but dangerous. Casmus teaches her how to remember dreams, and tells her that soon they will be going to Mount Plutarch to have her abilities tested by the Kingmaker. On Santine, the Minister of Chance arrives and meets with the leaders of the resistance.

When the Doctor and Speedwell find more bodies, they notice there appears to be two different styles of killing, some for feeding, and some were just in the way. They see a man hole, and beyond they run into the killer — the vampire Nessican who had killed Valentine. Speedwell shoots him, but to no effect as only severing the spinal column would kill a vampire. Nessican attacks the Doctor and succeeds in drinking some of his blood, but the Doctor had eaten some garlic flakes which kill the vampire. On hearing a description of a woman who fled the bar, the Doctor recognises who it is and realises she is the second killer.

Back at the laboratory, Campion has been attacked and killed. Dr Kane appears detached about his death before Antimony — he realises she killed him. When the Doctor and Speedwell arrive, Speedwell shoots her, but this time succeeds in severing her spinal column. Kane tells the Doctor that the rent in time is the work of a Time Lord, but not who, before she dies.

Before his death, Nessican had managed to contact his employer, Tannis, and informed him that the Earth is rich in resources and completely defenceless. The Doctor gives Speedwell Nessican's transmitter and asks him to take it to a certain man. Speedwell knows the man – it is his boss, Speedwell is not in fact a policeman but a lieutenant colonel.

The Minister of Chance takes Sala to Captain Carne and hands her over to him. He suspects a ruse but sends her away to be tortured, planning to kill the Minister at a later date. On the Canisians homeworld, Premier Bedloe announces the defeat of the Santine Republic by Tannis, claiming that its people had been freed from oppression. Meanwhile, Tannis's troops have surrounded the city, and he has taken Bedloe's child as a hostage. When Bedloe confronts him, he denies wanting to overthrow the Premier, but he intends to use him as a front while Tannis wields the true power and goes about his plans of universal conquest. Tannis leaves Bedloe accompanied by one of his men, Major Bander, who will prevent him from coming to any harm, unless Tannis says otherwise.

The Doctor realises that the tears in the fabric of time could only be caused by another Time Lord misusing his powers for evil. Antimony wonders whether it could be the Minister of Chance, but the Doctor thinks otherwise. He plans to strike back on Alpha Canis whilst the Minister keeps Tannis busy on Santine.

Casmus explains to Ace that he predicted that she would be on the Canisian prison ship from where he rescued her. He tells her that there is no true chaos in the Universe, just an Order of great complexity than can be easily perceived.

Sala is tortured and afterwards put in the same cell as the Minister, who heals her wounds. Her broken wrist repaired, they will be able to infiltrate the base and find the other political prisoners. When Carne interrogates the Minister, he is told that the Santine resistance plans to attack a prison at Luria. His reaction reveals to Sala and the Minister that the prison really exists, which they had not known with certainty. They turn the tables on Carne threatening to inform the Fleet Pilot that he had revealed the prison's existence. Carne shows them a prison map, and the Minister tells him where the resistance intend to attack. Having seen all the weaknesses of the prison, the Minister uses a word of power which causes the planetary computer system to shut down. The Minister and Sala flee in the confusion.

On Alpha Canis, the Doctor tells Antimony that they can't just kill Tannis, as someone else would take his place. It is the Doctor's plan to give Tannis another enemy to fight — Premier Bedloe. The Doctor investigates the Premier's family and works out what Tannis has done to Bedloe. The Doctor informs a public wallscreen that he has kidnapped Bedloe's children and waits for the City Guards to turn up and arrest them.

The Fleet Pilot reports what the Minister has done to Tannis, but he is not surprised at all and orders him to locate the Minister. However, when found Tannis will deal with him personally.

Ace and Casmus spend some time star gazing and Casmus tells her that she will never have normal relationships with other humans, now that she has a special relationship with Time. Ace sees the loneliness of being a Time Lord.

Bedloe decides to question the Doctor personally about his "confession", while Bander reports back to Tannis that the man he was told to look out for has arrived. The Doctor admits the confession was just to get Bedloe's attention. Bedloe says that he would move against Tannis if his child could be kept from harm. Trusting the Doctor, he tells him of Tannis's private villa. The Doctor and Antimony break into the villa, rescue the child and return him to his father. When they return however, they are confronted with Tannis, who has struck a new deal with Bedloe.

On Santine, the Minister of Chance and Sala try to find their way back to the resistance. The Minister tells her that his true name is unpronounceable and she gives him the nickname "Snake". She is still in a weakened state from her interrogation, and the Minister has to use his healing powers again. Just as Sala asks to be left behind, they are found by a resistance member who tells them that they now have the required information to rescue the prisoners from the Lurian camp. When Sala asks the Minister why he doesn't use his powers to save everyone's life, he tells her that she cannot understand his people's position.

Ace faces a test known as the "Cavern of Infinite Death". Casmus tells her she must pass through the Cavern without touching the red liquid that flows through it, as it would have disastrous consequences. Stepping on the stalagmites, Ace proceeds to cross, but at one point stumbles and falls into the liquid. She panics, but Casmus tells her the liquid is not poisonous, merely coloured red. Soon she will be able to break the rules of the Universe. Casmus warns her that her new powers could easily be misused.

Tannis threatens to shoot either the Doctor or Antimony if they move. He then reveals his secret — he is a Time Lord — but unlike the Doctor or the Minister, one who wants to use his powers to rule the Universe. The Doctor tells Antimony to flee, but he refuses. Tannis says that this is because Antimony, without realising it, considers the Doctor to be his father. He then shoots Antimony in the leg, revealing circuits and servo-mechanisms. Having seen so many companions leave or die, the Doctor built a companion who would always stay with him. To the Doctor's dismay and helplessness, Tannis taunts him saying the Doctor could save Antimony by speaking Tannis out of existence, but that he won't do it. Finally, Tannis shoots Antimony in the head, and leaves the Doctor to watch him die.

Back on Santine, Tannis reveals to the Pilot why he is concerned about the activities of the Minister. He had dropped a plague on a particularly obstinate planet to exterminate the population, but after three days the plague had vanished, the population unharmed. Upon investigation, Tannis discovered a cult dedicated to a god they called "Manaster". The Santine resistance mount their attack on the Luria prison, but Tannis is prepared, and sends in ships to slaughter the escapees. Sala pleads with the Minister to use his powers to interfere, but he refuses until Sala is singled out by the Pilot. Seeing her gunned down, the Minister loses his self-control, and unleashes a rage upon Tannis's ships. Many of them explode, and Tannis orders the rest to retreat. Leaving the fate of the Minister to others, Tannis decides it is time to visit the Earth.

Ace is brought to the cave of the Kingmaker, an old woman who watches over the Time Lords, as they themselves watch over time. She gives Ace a test, she will be sent to Anima Persis, a world ravaged by biological and psychic warfare. She must restore the planet to its rightful inhabitants without abusing her new powers. Ace is given a TARDIS and a wand. Casmus tells her the wand has the ability to manipulate time, a power the Time Lords resist using. She leaves in the TARDIS to Anima Persis, with a strong warning not to use the wand there. Casmus tells her he will be waiting for her when she returns, but the Kingmaker knows his time is near to an end.

Ace arrives on Anima Persis in a wasteland where she encounters the terrified survivors. Identifying herself hesitantly as a Time Lord, she informs them she is there to defeat the ghosts and reclaim the planet. A young girl named Megan offers to guide Ace, and takes her to a crater. There, Ace is assaulted by her own thoughts, directed back at her by the dead spirits. They threaten to take her new TARDIS and use it to travel throughout the Universe spreading terror, unless Ace gives Megan over to them. The dilemma cracks Ace's resolve and she uses her forbidden Time Lord powers to manipulate time to destroy the spirits. Later, she wakes within the TARDIS, and finds herself with Golcrum, a Canisian guard on the ship from which Casmus rescued her. He was exiled to Anima Persis by Tannis because of that failure, and Ace was the first living being he has seen. Ace is despondent as she wiped out the villagers in her attempt to destroy the dead spirits, and misused her Time Lord powers.

Casmus is visited by Tannis, who has come to kill him. Tannis has eliminated the other Time Lords and set the Doctor and the Minister against each other. Casmus reveals Ace has been transformed into a Time Lord, but Tannis laughs at him, and he says he will destroy her too. Casmus says the age of the Time Lords has passed, and expresses pity for Tannis even as he prepares to shoot him.

The distraught Doctor goes to Mount Plutarch to plead with the Kingmaker, but she will not interfere with Tannis's actions. He is utterly evil, but has broken no laws of time, only amassing power through the use of conventional force. She tells the Doctor that Tannis is not responsible for the damage to time, it is in fact the Minister of Chance who is the cause. The Doctor is charged with the responsibility to destroy his friend, before the damage engulfs the Universe.

The Doctor goes to Casmus's garden, and is reunited with Ace. They mourn Casmus's death, and the Doctor reassures Ace about the events she witnessed on Anima Persis. There have been no living beings on that planet for centuries, everything she had seen was an illusion. She has not yet developed the powers she thought she had. Ace produces Casmus's wand, but the Doctor shows her it is just a stick. Anima Persis was a test, one that all Time Lords fail, so that the memory of failure stays with them forever as a stark warning. Now, together, they must deal with Tannis. Ace and Golcrum leave for Earth to prepare a welcome for Tannis, whilst the Doctor must now confront his old friend. Consumed with grief and fury, the Minister shouts at the Doctor to leave him alone. The structure of time has been corrupted, so the Doctor revokes the Minister's TARDIS, and leaves him to face himself, now powerless.

At NASA mission control, a fleet of spaceships is detected approaching Earth. The President is informed, and receives an ultimatum from Tannis. He must surrender immediately, or a bomb will be dropped on London. The President receives a telephone call from the British Prime Minister, who informs that counter-measures are being taken. The bomb explodes in the ship before it is launched, and to Tannis's shock, a fleet of shuttles emerges from behind the Moon. Tannis then himself receives a message from Brigadier Lethbridge-Stewart, and some of his ships are destroyed.

Tannis orders his troops to make a ground assault, and they land near Stonehenge. They move towards London, but are confronted by UNIT troops, led by Lieutenant Colonel Speedwell. Abandoning his troops to their fate, Tannis seeks out the Doctor. He finds Ace first and starts to beat her to death, before the Doctor finds them. Tannis baits him, that he dare not use his powers to save Ace, as he had not saved Antimony. However, Tannis must be stopped. With no surviving Time Lords, Tannis would then be free to misuse his own powers. He had not done so before so that other Time Lords would not act in concert against him. With the choice between himself abusing his powers, or leaving Tannis free to abuse his, the Doctor must use them to stop Tannis and does so, even though it means his own passing. Declaring himself a God of the Fourth, the Doctor unleashes the power, and afterwards, he and Tannis are gone.

Speedwell, Golcrum and the Brigadier celebrate the defeat of the Canisians, but Ace finds them and tells them the Doctor is gone. Ace returns to the Kingmaker, and, conferred with full Time Lord powers, a new age is begun.

Notes
The events portrayed in Death Comes to Time appear to be at odds with established Doctor Who continuity. The apparent death of the Doctor seems to conflict with his regeneration into the Eighth Doctor in the 1996 telemovie, however, it is theorized that this was a ruse, and the Doctor didn't use the full extent of his power; this might explain the sudden departure of Ace. The fate of Ace conflicts with other spin-offs such as the Virgin New Adventures and various comic strips, although these were already incompatible with one another. More significantly, it is implicitly disputed by Sarah Jane Smith's statement in the The Sarah Jane Adventures story Death of the Doctor. The god-like powers demonstrated by the Time Lords here were rarely seen in the television series, though they are in keeping with developments to the Seventh Doctor's character towards the end of the series. The Doctor claims in the story to have never been a baby; this is implicitly disputed by the Tenth Doctor in "The Last of the Time Lords" and definitively contradicted by the Eleventh Doctor in "A Good Man Goes to War".
This was the first Doctor Who webcast. Three more followed: Real Time, Shada and Scream of the Shalka. 
The episode titles of the five episodes were Pilot Episode or At the Temple of the Fourth, Planet of Blood, The Prisoner, No Child of Earth, Death Comes to Time.
The pilot was originally commissioned for BBC Radio 4, but they declined to broadcast it or to commission a series. As an experiment, BBCi agreed to webcast it, and its popularity led them to commission the full series.
"Colin Meek" is widely understood to be a pseudonym for producer Dan Freedman.
Artwork for the webcast animations was provided by comic strip artist Lee Sullivan (comics).
Some unnamed characters in this story are also portrayed by Dan Freedman, Richard Garaghty, Demetri Goritsas, John Humphrys, Benjamin Langley, David Soul, Moray Treadwell.
The music used during the death scene of the Seventh Doctor was "Pog Aon Oidhche Earraich" by Runrig.

Media Release
The full adventure has been released in an expanded and re-edited edition on CD.  It also includes an interview on the Today programme on BBC Radio 4 with John Humphrys talking to Sylvester McCoy, a science writer for the Daily Mail, and a Dalek.  In addition to this, there is a spoof interview between John Humphrys and General Tannis, plus a selection of audio out-takes from the recording.  It has also been released on mp3-CD which also includes the original RealPlayer webcast.

Spin off

The character of the Minister of Chance (now played by Julian Wadham) is played in a podcast-only audio drama entitled The Minister of Chance, also featuring Sylvester McCoy, Paul McGann and Jenny Agutter.

References

External links

Webcasts based on Doctor Who
Seventh Doctor audio plays
2001 audio plays
2002 audio plays
UNIT audio plays
Gallifrey audio plays
British drama web series